Jesús Tecú Osorio (born 1971 in Río Negro, Baja Verapaz) is a Guatemalan social activist, worker for human rights, and advocate for the Achi Maya.

In 1982, much of the population of Río Negro was murdered; Tecú survived, but witnessed the deaths of most of his immediate family members. He spent two years as a household slave to one of the perpetrators before being remanded into the custody of his older sister, who had also survived the massacres.

In 1993, Tecú began legal proceedings to have the mass grave of Río Negro exhumed; this led directly to the prosecution of three of the men responsible for the massacre and, in 1998, to their being sentenced to death for crimes against humanity (in 1999, their sentences were commuted to 60 years in prison). As of 2006, this is the only Guatemalan trial for crimes against humanity committed during the civil war for which the perpetrators have been convicted.

Tecú has organized four separate charitable organizations, including a legal aid clinic, for the Achi Maya people. He has written his memoirs – these have been translated into English as The Massacres of Rio Negro – and gone on speaking tours throughout Canada, Europe, and the USA.

In 1996, Tecú won the Reebok Human Rights Award; he used the USD 25,000 prize money to start the New Hope Foundation which provided scholarships and later expanded into a school called the New Hope Community Bilingual Institute in Rabinal. In 2007, he was awarded an honorary law degree from Saint Francis Xavier University. In 2010, Tecu was awarded the Roger Baldwin Medal of Liberty by Human Rights First.

See also
Río Negro Massacre
ADIVIMA

References

External links
Reebok's profile of Jesús Tecú Osorio (via archive.org)
Fundación Nueva Esperanza/ New Hope Foundation

1971 births
Living people
People from Baja Verapaz Department
Guatemalan human rights activists
Guatemalan Maya people
Indigenous activists of the Americas